

History
KZXL was first proposed by Harold J. Haley Jr., the son of longtime Livingston, Texas radio broadcaster Harold J. Haley Sr., who owned and operated KETX, KETX-FM and KETX-LP. A Construction Permit to build the facility was granted by the Federal Communications Commission on March 20, 2001. The facility was built and received its License to Cover on June 18, 2002. The station was originally programmed with a Classic Country format, branded as "Cat Country".

The station was assigned the call sign KLSN on October 12, 2001, during construction of the facility. The station changed its call sign on to KLJK on July 4, 2008, and to the current KZXL on March 3, 2009.

The station has no affiliation with internet radio hobbyist Allen Fitts who has operated an online station with the same call sign, which largely, has been used as a platform of online bullying toward residents of the cities of Woodville, Texas and Marshall, Texas.

References

External links
Hot 96.3 Lufkin Facebook

ZXL
Radio stations established in 2001
Urban contemporary radio stations in the United States
2001 establishments in Texas